Bernard Verley (born 4 October 1939) is a French actor and producer.

Biography
Former student of les Beaux-Arts in Lille, he then joined the TNP Jean Vilar. His brother Renaud Verley is also an actor. In the mid-1970s, he devoted himself to film production. He returns as an actor in the 90s, after a break of nine years.

Filmography

Actor

Producer

Theater

See also

References

External links

1939 births
Living people
French male film actors
French male television actors
20th-century French male actors
21st-century French male actors
Mass media people from Lille